Danny Lendich is a business owner and franchise operator, having opened the first Wendy's in New Zealand in the 1980s. Danny also owns his own large equipment company, Lendich Construction. Danny has been heavily involved in racing in New Zealand, sponsoring one of the most successful Midget drivers of all time, Sleepy Tripp.

References

Living people
New Zealand businesspeople
Year of birth missing (living people)